The Secret Code can refer to:

 The Secret Code (film), a 1918 film starring Gloria Swanson
 The Secret Code (serial), a 1942 film serial
 "The Secret Code" (Seinfeld), a television episode
 The Secret Code (album), by Tohoshinki (TVXQ), 2009
 Secret Code, an album by Aya Kamiki, 2006